Alix L. Olson (born 1975) is an American poet who works exclusively in spoken word. She graduated from Wesleyan University in 1997 and uses her work to address issues of capitalism, racism, sexism, homophobia, heterosexism, misogyny, and patriarchy. She identifies as a queer feminist.

Early years and education
Alix Olson was born in Bethlehem, Pennsylvania in 1975 to parents who were both politically-minded professors and held ideals that she believes were passed along to her. She has recalled early childhood memories sitting under a table coloring protest signs. Olson attended Stockholm University in 1996. She received a BA from Wesleyan University in 2007 and a PhD in political science from the University of Massachusetts at Amherst with a graduate certificate in advanced feminist studies.

Career
Olson taught as faculty at the Juniper Institute for Young Writers at University of Massachusetts at Amherst in Summer 2011 and 2012, at CSU Summer Arts at California State University in Fresno, California and at the Eleanor Roosevelt Center at Val Kill's Young Women's Leadership.

In 1997, Olson began performing at the Nuyorican Poets Cafe, where she  made the 1998 Nuyorican Poetry Slam team. She and her fellow Nuyorican team members Lynne Procope, Steve Colman and Guy LeCharles Gonzalez went on to win the 1998 National Poetry Slam Championship in Austin, Texas. This championship would lead to Soft Skull Press publishing the anthology Burning Down the House which showcased poetry by Olson, Procope, Coleman and Gonzalez as well as poetry by the 1998 Nuyorican Team's coach, Roger Bonair-Agard. In 1999 Alix Olson beat Stacey Ann Chin in a slam off giving her the title of the OUTWRITE slam champion.

Olson recorded and published three spoken word CDs Built Like That (2001), Independence Meal (2004), and Protagonist (2014). She was the subject of the documentary Left Lane: On the Road with Folk Poet Alix Olson, which was released in 2004 and directed by Samantha Farinella. "Making cameos on the DVD are Holly Near and Amy Ray of the Indigo Girls and Patricia Ireland, the former director of the National Organization for Women." On June 11, 2006, Alix Olson co-hosted the Sixth Annual Outmusic Awards with Ari Gold (musician), at the Knitting Factory in Rochester, New York. She is also the editor of the spoken word anthology, Word Warriors: 35 Women Leaders in the Spoken Word Revolution with a foreword by Eve Ensler. This collection of essays and poetry was published by Seal Press in 2007 and features work from artists such as Patricia Smith, Eileen Myles, Sarah Jones, Suheir Hammad, Staceyann Chin, Cristin O'Keefe Aptowicz, Lynn Breedlove and Michelle Tea. Additionally, Alix Olson's poem "Warrior" is referenced in the book Fight like a Girl: How to be a Fearless Feminist by Megan Seely.

On July 8, 2014, blogger Justyn Hintze wrote about Apple's engraving service, which seemed to be exhibiting sexist programming. According to Hintze this came to her attention on attempting to engrave her new shiny iDevice with an Alix Olson lyric "I’ll give myself a lube job, shake my broomstick 'til my clit throbs," a lyric which she describes as "feminist, sex-positive, and it makes me smile. Every. single. time." The blog and subsequent campaign on Twitter, #MyClitMyChoice, has garnered international media attention.

Olson's work "has been featured on a variety of NPR programs, HBO's Def Poetry Jam, Air America with Rachel Maddow, in the New York Times, Washington Post, Curve Magazine," as well as "Girlfriends Magazine, The Advocate, OUT Magazine, Lesbian Review of Books. She has also made appearances on the covers of Lambda Book Report, Lavender Lens, Velvet Park magazine" and Ms. Magazine. Alix has appeared on the nationally syndicated Air America's "Unfiltered" radio (co-hosts Rachel Maddow, Rachel Winstead, and Chuck D), as well as on Oxygen television, CNN, HBO, In the Life, WXPN's World Cafe with David Dye, and local radio stations around the country." Additionally, she "has headlined national conferences for the National Organization for Women, GenderPac, and the Lesbian Summit. Most recently, Alix performed for one million people at the Washington, D.C. March for Women's Lives. She has headlined international poetry festivals in Portugal, the Netherlands, England and Australia."

She is an assistant professor of women's, gender, and sexuality studies at Oxford College of Emory University.

Critical analysis
bell hooks has described Word Warriors: 35 Women Leaders in the Spoken Word Revolution (Seal Press, 2007), which Olson edited, as "daring to be heard.. to resurrect you." Historian and activist Howard Zinn has called Alix "an ingenious poet, a brilliant performer, a funny person, a serious thinker. Quite simply, extraordinary." A critique in Utne Reader calls Olson "...the spoken word diva everyone's talking about." In describing her live performances, The Progressive calls Olson "an electrifying performer who seduces the audience with wit and energy, spinning tales of life on the road between her fiery poems. A sharpshooter with theatrical flair, Olson oozes both love and rage." The Progressive has also referenced Olson as a "word warrior." Ms. Magazine has described Olson as a "road-poet-on-a-mission."

Books
 Word Warriors: 35 Women Leaders in the Spoken Word Revolution, Seal Press, 2007.
 Burning Down the House, Soft Skull Press, 2003.

Awards
 1998: National Nuyorican Poetry Slam Championship (Austin, TX).
 1999: OUTWRITE slam champion.
 2000: Awarded a New York Foundation for the Arts Fellowship.
 2002: Was a triple nominee for the category of "Outstanding Artist-Activist" for the OUTMusic Awards.
 2003: Received Washington DC's Rape Crisis "Visionary Award" (along with Margaret Cho and Nobuko Oyabu).
 2004: Voted "Best Activist" (along with MoveOn) as part of Venus Magazine's "Hott List" and OutMusician of the Year by OutMusic for Excellence in artistic expression and LGBT community activism.
 2011: Received a Political Science Travel Grant from the University of Massachusetts at Amherst.
 2012: Received a Research Assistantship as part of the Graduate Research Initiative Program (GRIP) and University of Massachusetts-Amherst's "Student Choice Teaching Award."
 2013: Received Center for Research on Families Fellowship and Distinguished Teaching Award (University of Massachusetts Amherst).
 2016: Awarded the New Political Science Christian Bay Award.
 Alix Olson has also been awarded the Barbara Deming Award and was offered a Hedgebrook Fellowship, which she declined.

Discography 
 2001: Built Like That
 2003: Independence Meal
 2014: Protagonist

References

External links

Official website

1975 births
Living people
American socialists
Anti-corporate activists
American feminist writers
Lesbian feminists
American lesbian writers
Queercore
Queer feminists
Queer women
Queer writers
American spoken word poets
Wesleyan University alumni
Writers from Bethlehem, Pennsylvania
American LGBT poets
American women poets
21st-century American poets
Feminist musicians
LGBT people from Pennsylvania
LGBT academics
21st-century American women writers